Thomas R. Wilson is a Canadian curler.

Awards
Canadian Curling Hall of Fame: 1985 (with all 1980 World champions team skipped by Rick Folk)
 Saskatchewan Sports Hall of Fame:
 1980 (1980 Rick Folk Curling Team)
 2004 (1983 Rick Folk Mixed Curling Team)

Teams

Men's

Mixed

Personal life
His brother Jim is a curler too and Tom's teammate.

References

External links
 
 Tom Wilson – Curling Canada Stats Archive
 Tom Wilson Gallery | The Trading Card Database
 

Living people
Brier champions
Canadian male curlers
Curlers from Saskatoon
World curling champions
Canadian mixed curling champions
Year of birth missing (living people)